POEA may refer to:

Polyethoxylated tallow amine
Philippine Overseas Employment Administration